is a professional Japanese baseball player. He plays pitcher for the Yokohama DeNA BayStars.

In Game 4 of the 2017 Japan Series, with DeNA facing elimination, Hamaguchi did not allow a hit for  innings.

On October 10, 2018, he was selected Japan national baseball team at the 2018 MLB Japan All-Star Series.

References

External links

 NPB.com

1995 births
Living people
Japanese baseball players
Nippon Professional Baseball pitchers
Baseball people from Saga Prefecture
Yokohama DeNA BayStars players